Mary Lou Guerinot is an American molecular geneticist who works as Ronald and Deborah Harris Professor in the Sciences at Dartmouth College. Her research concerns the cellular uptake and regulation of metal ions.

Biography 
Guerinot was born and grew up in Rochester, New York. She graduated from Cornell University in 1975, and earned her Ph.D. in 1979 from Dalhousie University under the supervision of David G. Patriquin. After postdoctoral research at the University of Maryland and Michigan State University, she joined the Dartmouth faculty in 1985. In 1994, Guerinot became the first women to chair a science department at Dartmouth when she was appointed the chair Department of Biological Sciences. She became the Harris Professor in 2005.

She became a fellow of the American Association for the Advancement of Science in 2007, and of the American Society of Plant Biologists in 2009. In 2016, she was elected to the National Academy of Sciences.

References

Year of birth missing (living people)
Living people
21st-century American biologists
American women biologists
Cornell University alumni
Dalhousie University alumni
Dartmouth College faculty
Fellows of the American Association for the Advancement of Science
Members of the United States National Academy of Sciences
American women academics
21st-century American women scientists